Suzi Mair (born 26 November 1967) is a Scottish journalist and former professional tennis player.

Career
Born and raised in Edinburgh, Mair was coached during her childhood by Polish Davis Cup player Ignacy Tłoczyński.

Mair, as a 16-year old, received a wildcard into the singles main draw of the 1984 Wimbledon Championships, losing in the first round to Amy Holton. She only competed briefly on tour and instead has gone on to have a career in journalism, working for many years as a television news reporter for STV.

Family
Mair is the elder sister of tennis player Michele and comes from a family with a long involvement in sport. Her father was Scotland rugby union international Norman Mair, later a well known sports journalist, as is her mother Lewine Mair, who is a former Daily Telegraph golf correspondent.

References

External links
 
 

1967 births
Living people
British female tennis players
Scottish female tennis players
Scottish sports journalists
Scottish women journalists
STV News newsreaders and journalists